The SoHo Playhouse is an Off-Broadway theatre at 15 Vandam Street in the Hudson Square area of Manhattan.

The  theatre opened in 1962 as the Village South Theatre with the original production of Jean Erdman's musical play The Coach with the Six Insides which was based upon James Joyce's last novel Finnegans Wake. The following year Edward Albee used profits from Who's Afraid of Virginia Woolf? to establish the Playwrights' Unit at the Village South Theatre; an organization which provided a platform for untested new playwrights to premiere their works. The theatre closed in 1970, with its last production being Michael Preston Barr and Dion McGregor's musical Who's Happy Now?. It did still house plays for various off-Broadway productions under the simple name of 15 Van Dam.  The theatre was home to the New York Academy of Theatrical Arts from 1970 until 1974.

It reopened in as the SoHo Playhouse in 1994 with a production of the play Grandma Sylvia's Funeral, which ran for four years. It has since served as an Off-Broadway receiving house.

References

Off-Broadway theaters
1962 establishments in New York City
Theatres completed in 1962
1970 disestablishments in New York (state)
1994 establishments in New York City
Hudson Square